The Builders Labourers Federation (BLF) was an Australian trade union that existed from 1911 until 1972, and from 1976 until 1986, when it was permanently deregistered in various Australian states by the federal Hawke Labor government and some state governments of the time. This occurred in the wake of a Royal Commission into corruption by the union. About the same time, BLF federal secretary Norm Gallagher was jailed for corrupt dealings after receiving bribes from building companies that he used to build a beach house.

Social and economic justice
The BLF fought successful campaigns which became known as the green bans against development projects which it viewed as harmful to the built and natural environment of Sydney and Melbourne. These campaigns included blocking plans to redevelop The Rocks area, Kelly's Bush in Hunters Hill, Centennial Park, the City Baths, Flinders Street Station and the Hotel Windsor. The green bans are now commonly recognised as directly responsible for saving areas of Sydney and Melbourne with substantial heritage value.  Victoria Hall in Fremantle, Western Australia was also saved from demolition by a green ban, in 1974.

They also took up other causes, such as Aboriginal rights, anti-war campaigns and support for pensioners. The BLF had a long-standing programme on Radio 3CR, "The Concrete Gang", which is now presented by the Construction, Forestry, Mining and Energy Union. One of the original announcers for the BLF was John Cummins.

Work-ins 
The BLF also helped organise a number of "work-ins" across Australia, where workers would take over a site for a few weeks and run it under workers' control. Some notable examples include:

 1972: Sydney Opera House
 1974: Wyong Plaza

NSW branch intervention
The federal union under Norm Gallagher faced many protests initially when it intervened in the affairs of the N.S.W. branch of the union in the mid-seventies. Many of the democratic measures installed by the N.S.W. branch leadership by Jack Mundey, Bob Pringle, Joe Owens and others were scrapped and many of the democratically imposed green bans were lifted. Officials of the N.S.W. branch eventually urged members to join the imposed branch, but were themselves blacklisted from the industry by federal union officials. The federal takeover of the N.S.W. branch was instrumental in calling off many of the imposed green bans and the cancellation of the union's commitment to fighting for permanence in the building industry.

BLF in Queensland
The BLF existed in Queensland as a state registered union (known as the Australian Building Construction Employees and Builders' Labourers' Federation (Queensland Branch) Union of Employees). The Queensland BLF was a part of the national BLF prior to the de-registration and was not as radical or militant as the branches in Victoria and New South Wales were perceived to be.

Whilst the BLF is usually associated with the left of the political spectrum, the Queensland BLF was historically aligned with the right faction of the Australian Labor Party. The Queensland BLF was a member of the Labor Unity faction which is sometimes referred to as the Old Guard. The Labor Unity Faction often votes with the "right" faction (also known as the AWU or Forum faction) at state Labor conferences.

On 16 October 2013, at the CFMEU Construction National Conference in Cairns, BLF secretary David Hanna and left-wing CFMEU Queensland (Construction Division) secretary Michael Ravbar announced the two unions would be merging. The merger was finalised in 2014.

Slogan
The federal BLF slogan, taken from a saying of Mao Zedong, was "Dare to struggle, Dare to win".

See also

References

Further reading

External links
Book Review: Liz Ross, Dare to Struggle, Dare to Win:  Builders Labourers Fight Deregistration 1981–1994
Green Bans: Campaigns to Protect the Environment
Australian Trade Union Archives entry: Australian Builders Labourers Federation (1911–1972)
How to build a trade union – an article on the BLF in Queensland

1911 establishments in Australia
1986 disestablishments in Australia
Defunct trade unions of Australia
Trade unions established in 1911
Builders' labourers' trade unions
Green bans